The 316th Airlift Division (316th AD) is an inactive United States Air Force organization. Its last assignment was with the United States Air Forces in Europe, assigned to Seventeenth Air Force, being stationed at Ramstein Air Base, Germany. It was inactivated on 1 May 1991.

History

Lineage
 Established as 316 Bombardment Wing, Very Heavy on 4 August 1944.
 Activated on 14 August 1944.
 Redesignated: 316 Composite Wing on 8 January 1946
 Redesignated: 316 Bombardment Wing, Very Heavy on 6 May 1946
 Inactivated on 21 June 1948
 Redesignated 316 Air Division (Defense) on 26 June 1953
 Organized on 18 September 1953
 Discontinued on 1 April 1960
 Redesignated 316 Air Division on 1 June 1985
 Activated on 14 June 1985
 Inactivated on 1 May 1991

Assignments
 Second Air Force, 14 August 1944
 Attached XXII Bomber Command, c. 14 August – c. 7 December 1944
 Army Service Forces, 8 July 1945
 United States Strategic Air Forces in the Pacific
 Eighth Air Force, 5 September 1945
 Pacific Air Command, U.S. Army
 1 Air Division, 13 June 1946 – 21 June 1948
 United States Air Forces in Europe
 Seventeenth Air Force, 18 September 1953
 United States Air Forces in Europe, 15 November 1959 – 1 April 1960
 United States Air Forces in Europe
 Seventeenth Air Force, 14 June 1985 – 1 May 1991.

Stations
 Peterson Field, Colorado, 14 August 1944 – 7 July 1945
 Kadena (later, Kadena Field, Kadena AAB, Kadena AFB), Okinawa, 17 August 1945 – 21 June 1948
 Rabat Salé AB, French Morocco (later, Morocco), 18 September 1953 – 1 April 1960
 Ramstein AB, West Germany (later Germany), 14 June 1985 – 1 May 1991.

Components
Wing
 86th Tactical Fighter: 14 June 1985 – 1 May 1991.

Groups
 22d Bombardment:   31 May 1946-by 31 May 1948
 333d Bombardment:  31 August 1945 – 28 May 1946
 346th Bombardment: 31 July 1945 – 30 June 1946
 382d Bombardment:  31 August 1945 – 4 January 1946
 383d Bombardment:  31 August 1945 – 3 January 1946

Squadrons
 28th Photographic Reconnaissance: 15–29 May 1946
 45th Fighter-Interceptor (later, 45 Fighter-Day): 18 September 1953 – 8 January 1958
 324th Fighter-Interceptor: 1 July 1958 – 8 March 1960
 357th Fighter-Interceptor: 18 September 1953 – 8 March 1960.

Aircraft
 B-29 Superfortress, 1945–1948
 F-86 Sabre, 1953–1960
 F-100 Super Sabre, 1956–1957
 F-16 Falcon, 1985–1991.

Operational history
The 316th Bombardment Wing trained in the United States before transfer to Okinawa in August 1945. Assigned units ferried Allied prisoners of war from Japan to the Philippines.

In September 1953, the 316th Division manned, equipped, trained, and maintained assigned units until April 1960. It provided warning and defense against potential hostile air operations against the Moroccan region of North Africa.

In 1985, the division gained operational responsibility to implement war and contingency plans. It also provided host support to units in the Kaiserslautern Military Community (KMC) as well as logistical support for other organizations in the European theater. In April–May 1991, assigned units deployed aircraft and personnel to Turkey in support of Operation Provide Comfort, a humanitarian relief effort to save the Kurds from starvation and resettle them in northern Iraq.

See also
 List of United States Air Force air divisions

References

External links
 

Air divisions of the United States Air Force